The Polish Army Veterans' Association in America (Stowarzyszenie Weteranów Armii Polskiej w Ameryce, SWAP), founded in May 1921 is a Polish-American association for veterans of the Blue Army during World War I.

History

During World War I the Polonia in the United States and Canada provided more than 28,000 volunteers to the Polish Army in France. About 14,500 returned after the War to America. In May 1921, at a convention in Cleveland the veterans founded the SWAP. Its first president was Teofil Starzyński, an outstanding activist with the Polish Falcons.

See also
Polish Combatants' Association
Polish Legion of American Veterans

References

External links 

 Polish Army Veterans' Association in America

Organizations established in 1921
Organizations based in New York City
American veterans' organizations
Polish-American organizations